Shimoni Primary Teachers College (SPTC), is a public college that trains primary school teachers in Uganda. The college has an attached primary school, Shimoni Demonstration School, where the trainee teachers practice and sharpen their teaching skills.

Location
The college is located in a neighborhood called Kitikifumba, in Kira Municipality, in Wakiso District, in the Central Region of Uganda. The geographical coordinates of the teachers college are:0°25'24.0"N, 32°37'57.0"E (Latitude:0.423333; Longitude:32.632500).

History
The college and demonstration school were started by Ugandan Asians in 1952.

The  piece of land in the city center, where the institution was originally housed, was leased to an investor, who started to erect Kampala Intercontinental Hotel on the site. The government of Uganda, acquired  in Kitifumba, where it constructed a new college at an estimated cost of US$4 million (UGX:8 billion at that time), with capacity of 450 student-teachers. During the construction, the Shimoni student-teachers were accommodated at Nyondo Teacher Training College in Mbale. The teacher training college opened in January 2011.

In January 2018, the construction of the new Shimoni Demonstration School in Kitikifumba was completed and the school was opened.

References

External links
  Uganda: New Shimoni Teachers' College Opens in Kira Town As at 4 January 2011.

Education in Uganda
1952 establishments in Uganda
Central Region, Uganda
Kira Town
Educational institutions established in 1952
Education schools in Uganda